Earth Airlines was an airline based in Lagos, Nigeria.

History
The airline operated charter services from Lagos. It was established and started operations in 2002.

The Nigerian government set a deadline of April 30, 2007 for all airlines operating in the country to re-capitalise or be grounded, in an effort to ensure better services and safety. The airline did not meet the Nigerian Civil Aviation Authority (NCAA)’s criteria in terms of re-capitalization and was re-registered for operation and currently operates no services.

Fleet 

The Earth Airlines fleet consisted of the following aircraft (at August 2006):

1 Boeing 737-200

References 

Defunct airlines of Nigeria
Airlines established in 2002
Airlines disestablished in 2007
2007 disestablishments in Nigeria
Defunct companies based in Lagos
Nigerian companies established in 2002